The 2014 Cooper Tires British Formula 3 International Series season was a multi-event motor racing championship for open wheel, formula racing cars held across England, and one round in Belgium. The championship featured a mix of professional motor racing teams and privately funded drivers competing in 2 litre Formula Three single seat race cars that conformed to the technical regulations for the championship. The 2014 season was the 64th and final season British Formula Three Championship. The series, promoted by the Stéphane Ratel Organisation, began on 4 May at Rockingham Motor Speedway and concluded on 14 September at Donington Park after a 21 race schedule held at seven meetings.

In a season that saw only four drivers contest the entire championship, it was Chinese driver Martin Cao who won the championship, driving for Fortec Motorsports. Cao started the season with a run of seven successive second-place finishes to a series of drivers, but his consistent finishing kept him towards the top of the championship standings. Cao took his first win at Thruxton, and went on to take four overall wins – plus a further two class wins behind drivers who were ineligible to score championship points – in the final three race meetings, to ultimately win the championship title by two points, ahead of team-mate Matt Rao. Rao won five races over the course of the season, with one fewer podium finish over the season, compared to Cao. Third place went to Camren Kaminsky, who took three podium finishes over his full season campaign.

Another Fortec driver, Sam MacLeod, finished fourth in the championship with four race victories, but he did not contest the whole campaign as his main focus for the season was in the German Formula Three championship with Van Amersfoort Racing. Marvin Kirchhöfer took two wins at Silverstone, when he was learning the circuit for the GP3 Series round at the circuit later in the season. Egor Orudzhev also won at Silverstone, while Roberto Merhi (two wins) and John Bryant-Meisner shared class victories at Spa-Francorchamps. Of the ineligible drivers, Ed Jones won all three races at Spa-Francorchamps, Santino Ferrucci won two out of three at Brands Hatch, while Sean Gelael finished second to Jones twice.

Drivers and teams

Race calendar and results
A seven-round calendar was announced on 23 September 2013. In a change of direction from recent seasons, the championship held only a single round outside the UK, in Belgium, supporting the 2014 24 Hours of Spa. The remaining six rounds were all be held in England. The three race format used in previous seasons was retained for all rounds of the championship.

After appearing on the 2013 calendar, the international round held at the Nürburgring was dropped from the 2014 calendar. Donington Park, Rockingham and Snetterton all returned to the calendar after a one-year hiatus, while Thruxton returned to the calendar for the first time since 2010.

Notes

Championship standings

References

External links
 The official website of the British Formula 3 Championship

British Formula Three Championship seasons
British Formula 3 Championship
Formula Three season
British Formula 3 Championship